Zbigniew Stanisław Herman (17 December 1935, in Tłuste – 4 May 2010) was a Polish physician and pharmacologist, rector of Silesian Medical Academy in years 1980–1982. He was decorated with an Officer's Cross and with a Commander's Cross with Star of Polonia Restituta.

Polish pharmacologists
1935 births
2010 deaths
Recipients of the Order of Polonia Restituta